The 2012 Canadian Wheelchair Curling Championship was held from March 18 to 25 at the Fort William Curling Club in Thunder Bay, Ontario.

Teams
The teams are listed as follows:

Round-robin standings
Final round-robin standings

Round-robin results
All times listed in Eastern Standard Time (UTC–5).

Draw 1
Monday, March 19, 10:30 am

Draw 2
Monday, March 19, 2:30 pm

Draw 3
Tuesday, March 20, 10:30 am

Draw 4
Tuesday, March 20, 2:30 pm

Draw 5
Wednesday, March 21, 2:30 pm

Draw 6
Wednesday, March 21, 6:30 pm

Draw 7
Thursday, March 22, 10:30 am

Draw 8
Thursday, March 22, 2:30 pm

Draw 9
Friday, March 23, 10:30 am

Tiebreaker
Friday, March 23, 3:00 pm

Playoffs

1 vs. 2 Game
Saturday, March 24, 2:30 pm

3 vs. 4 Game
Saturday, March 24, 10:30 am

Semifinal
Sunday, March 25, 10:30 am

Final
Sunday, March 25, 2:30 pm

References

External links
Home Page

Wheelchair Curling Championship
Canadian Wheelchair Curling Championship 
Sports competitions in Thunder Bay
Curling in Northern Ontario
Canadian Wheelchair Curling Championships
Wheelchair Curling Championship